Johann Becker may refer to:
 Johann Becker (organist) (1726–1803), German organist
 Johann Becker (politician) (1869–1951), German politician
 Johann Becker (entomologist) (1932–2004), Brazilian entomologist
 Johann Philip Becker (1809–1886), German revolutionary